Råkvåg, or Råkvågen is a village in the municipality of Indre Fosen in Trøndelag county, Norway. It is located at the inner part of the Stjørnfjorden in the northern part of what was the old municipality of Rissa. The Ramsvik Church lies just south of the village.

Råkvåg is popular with boat owners. It has become a tradition to meet here on one weekend during the summer (known as Råkvåg-dagene), when boats of all sizes and people of all ages gather to relax and socialize. Råkvåg-dagene is usually organized the last weekend of July.

References

Villages in Trøndelag
Indre Fosen